Gavin Sutherland may refer to:

The Sutherland Brothers, Gavin and Iain Sutherland
Gavin Sutherland (archer) (born 1979), Zimbabwean archer
Gavin Sutherland (conductor) (born 1972), conductor, composer/arranger and pianist
Gavin Sutherland (politician) (1893–1970), Australian politician